The Burning Up Tour was the fifth concert tour by the Jonas Brothers. This tour was to promote their third album A Little Bit Longer. This tour had also promoted the Disney Channel Original Movie, Camp Rock in which the Jonas Brothers had starred. Also, the Burning Up Tour was used to promote Disney starlet, Demi Lovato's music. The tour had started on July 4, 2008, in Toronto, and concluded on March 22, 2009, in San Juan. Honor Society, Avril Lavigne, Demi Lovato, The Veronicas, Robert Schwartzman, and Taylor Swift appeared as guest performers on select tour dates. The tour went on to gross US$41 million in 48 shows.

The shows performed in Anaheim on July 13 and 14 were filmed for the concert film Jonas Brothers: The 3D Concert Experience which was released February 27, 2009. The live soundtrack was released the same week prior to the film's release on February 24, 2009.

Set list 

 "That's Just the Way We Roll"
 "Shelf"
 "Hold On"
 "BB Good"
 "Goodnight and Goodbye"
 "Video Girl"
 "Gotta Find You"
 "This Is Me" (with Demi Lovato)
 "A Little Bit Longer"
 "I'm Gonna Getcha Good" 
 "Still In Love With You"
 "Tonight"
 "Year 3000"
 "Pushin' Me Away"
 "Hello Beautiful"
 "Lovebug"
 "Can't Have You"
 "Play My Music"
 "Burnin' Up" (with Big Rob Feggans)
 "When You Look Me in the Eyes"
 "S.O.S"

Tour dates

Notes

References

2008 concert tours
Jonas Brothers concert tours